The YCO Painters were the multi-titled Filipino basketball team of the YCO Athletic Club that was active from the late 1940s to 1981 in the now-defunct Manila Industrial and Commercial Athletic Association (MICAA). YCO Athletic Club was founded by businessman and sportsman Manuel “Manolo” Elizalde and owned under his company Elizalde & Co., Inc., manufacturers of YCO floor wax and paints.

The Painters were known as the first basketball dynasty in the Philippines, having dominated MICAA and BAP tournaments during the 1950s to early 1960s. The team's most famous player was Carlos Loyzaga, considered as the greatest Filipino basketball player of his time. It made basketball history by winning seven consecutive National Open championships (1954-1960), seven MICAA titles and the first grandslam in Philippine basketball (1954), when the Painters wrapped the National Open, MICAA and Challenge to Champions diadems, including winning 95 out of 109 games.

When Elizalde & Co., Inc. became one of nine companies that formed the professional Philippine Basketball Association (PBA) in 1975, the YCO franchise was retained in the amateur ranks and elevated most of its YCO players to their professional PBA franchise, named Tanduay.

The YCO franchise ended with the closure of the MICAA in 1982.

Rivalry with Ysmael Steel Admirals
The Painters were best remembered for its rivalry with the Ysmael Steel Admirals from 1958 to 1967. The Painters and the Admirals would split the MICAA championships in the first four years of the 1960s playing against each other, The Painters won in 1960 and 1963 and the Admirals in 1961–1962.

During the 1961 MICAA finals, with the best-of-three series tied at 1-1, YCO defaulted the game for refusing to play in the final game at the Araneta Coliseum and the Admirals were declared champions.

The Admirals disbanded after winning the 1967 MICAA crown.

Legacy

From 1986 to 1987, a new YCO franchise briefly emerged to play in the Phililippine Amateur Basketball League (PABL), called the YCO Shine Masters.  The franchise was short-lived due to the financial difficulties faced by its parent, Elizalde & Co., Inc.

Notable players

(A-F)
Emilio Achacoso
Sixto Agbay
Cristino Arroyo
Kurt Bachmann ✝
Carlos Badion ✝
Raymundo "Chuck" Barreiro
Miguel Bilbao
Jess Bito
Joseph Lee Braun (a reinforcement from San Jose State College)
Ramoncito Bugia
Ramon Campos, Jr. ✝
Rene Canent
Ely Capacio ✝
Loreto Carbonell ✝
Orly Castelo
Nathaniel Castillo
Benjamin Cleofas
Ricardo "Joy" Cleofas
Joseph Conolly
Dading Cuna
Valentin "Tito" Eduque ✝
Armando Escober
Pepe Esteva
Adel D. Feliciano
Danny Florencio ✝

(G-L)
Alberto Gagan
Antonio Genato
Edgardo "Egay" Gomez ✝
Gregorio Gozum
Romulo Guille
Rafael Hechanova
Joseph Herrera
Enrico Ilustre
Robert Jaworski
Bonifacio de Jesus ✝
Henry Kappert
Jose Laganson
Eduardo Lim ✝
Frankie Lim
Roberto Littaua
Carlos Loyzaga ✝
Chito Loyzaga
Geronimo Lucido

(M-R)
Alejandro Manansala
Jaime Manansala
Guillermo Manotoc
Alex Marquez
Amado Martelino
Antonio "Pocholo" Martinez ✝
Jose Ma. Mendieta
Abe Monzon
Edgardo Ocampo ✝
Pablo Ocampo
James Payne
Rolando Pineda
Renato Reyes ✝
Eduardo Rivera
Edgardo Roque
Roberto dela Rosa

(S-Z)
Quirino Salazar
Marte Samson
Bruce Sanderson
Valerio delos Santos
Kurt Seeberger
Cesar Sequera
Alex Tan
Elias Tolentino ✝
Mariano Tolentino ✝
Martin Urra ✝
Arturo Valenzona
Gerardo Versoza
Freddie Webb
Francis Wilson
Jose Yango
Roberto Yburan

See also
 Tanduay Rhum Makers
 YCO Shine Masters

References

Manila Industrial and Commercial Athletic Association teams
Defunct basketball teams in the Philippines
Sports clubs disestablished in 1981